Zarandin-e Sofla (also Romanized as Zarandīn-e Soflá; also known as Pā’īn Zarandīn and Zarandīn-e Pā’īn) is a village in Peyrajeh Rural District, in the Central District of Neka County, Mazandaran Province, Iran. At the 2006 census, its population was 2,166, in 572 families.

References 

Populated places in Neka County